Southern Medical University, formerly known as First Military Medical University, affiliated to the People's Liberation Army of China, is an institution of higher learning in Guangzhou, the capital city of Guangdong Province, China. It was founded in 1951 and became one of the National Key Universities in 1979. Approved by the State Council and the Central Military Commission of the PLA, the university came under the jurisdiction of Guangdong Province in August 2004, whereupon it was renamed Southern Medical University.

Southern Medical University is in the foothills of the picturesque Baiyun Mountain in Guangzhou. The main campus, together with its south campus in the southern suburb of Guangzhou, covers an area of nearly one square kilometer. Its award-winning gardens are known for rows of green trees and bouquets of flowers blossoming on its campuses all throughout the year.

Rankings and reputation
Times Higher Education ranked it 801–1000 in 2019, 1001+ in 2020 & 601–800 in 2021, 401-500 in 2022.1574 by 4icu world ranking, US News ranked it 860 in Best Global Universities and 281 for Clinical Medicine, CWUR ranked it 628  and 1034 by Webometrics world ranking.

Academics

This university offers courses in Clinical Medicine at the Bachelors and Masters levels, in Western medicine, traditional Chinese medicine, economics and medical-related fields. Students are also taught English (for Chinese students) and Mandarin Chinese (for foreign students) at the basic level.

Southern Medical University is recognized by the World Health Organization and by the Medical Council of India.

The university is a rich haven for research and development in the field of medicine.

Affiliated hospitals

Southern Medical University flourishes along with its handover from the military system to the civilian one. Its seven affiliated hospitals are

 Nanfang Hospital
 Zhujiang Hospital
 Hua'nan Hospital
 Nanhua Hospital
 Stomatology Hospital
 Pingxiang Hospital
 Jiangdu Hospital
 Xinhui People's Hospital
Six of them have been appraised as “First-Class Hospitals at Grade III”.

References

External links
Southern Medical University website in Chinese
Southern Medical University website in English

Universities in China with English-medium medical schools
Universities and colleges in Guangdong
Education in Guangzhou
Military education and training in China
Educational institutions established in 1951
Medical schools in China
1951 establishments in China